Meigenia is a genus of flies in the family Tachinidae.

Species
Meigenia bellina Mesnil, 1967
Meigenia dorsalis (Meigen, 1824)
Meigenia fuscisquama Liu & Zhang, 2007
Meigenia grandigena (Pandellé, 1896)
Meigenia incana (Fallén, 1810)
Meigenia majuscula (Rondani, 1859)
Meigenia mutabilis (Fallén, 1810)
Meigenia nigra Chao & Sun, 1992
Meigenia picta Mesnil, 1961
Meigenia simplex Tschorsnig & Herting, 1998
Meigenia submissa (Aldrich & Webber, 1924)
Meigenia tridentata Mesnil, 1961
Meigenia uncinata Mesnil, 1967
Meigenia velutina Mesnil, 1952

References

Diptera of Europe
Diptera of North America
Diptera of Asia
Exoristinae
Tachinidae genera
Taxa named by Jean-Baptiste Robineau-Desvoidy